Carsten Lakies (born 8 January 1971 in Kassel) is a German football coach and a former player.

Career
Lakies spent two seasons in the Bundesliga with FC Bayern Munich and Hertha BSC. Lakies was involved in an incident during the 1996–97 Bundesliga season, when he was substituted into the game during a match between Bayern Munich and SC Freiburg. At a disappointing score of 0–0 with only ten minutes to play, coach Giovanni Trappatoni brought Lakies on for star striker Jürgen Klinsmann, who, in anger about the decision, kicked a nearby advertising can, an action that brought significant media attention.

Coaching career
In summer 2007, he began his coaching career at KSV Baunatal. In summer 2010, he was named as manager of SVG Göttingen.

Honours
 Bundesliga champion: 1996–97

References

1971 births
Living people
German footballers
German football managers
Bundesliga players
2. Bundesliga players
KSV Hessen Kassel players
SV Darmstadt 98 players
FC Bayern Munich footballers
FC Bayern Munich II players
Hertha BSC players
Hertha BSC II players
SV Waldhof Mannheim players
Karlsruher SC players
Chemnitzer FC players
Stuttgarter Kickers players
FSV Frankfurt players
VfR Mannheim players
Association football forwards